The 1974 municipal election was held October 16, 1974 to elect a mayor and twelve aldermen to sit on Edmonton City Council and seven trustees to sit on each of the public and separate school boards.

Voter turnout

There were 141,636 ballots cast out of 406,995 eligible voters, for a voter turnout of 36.4%.

Results

(bold indicates elected, italics indicate incumbent)

Mayor

Aldermen
Guide:
E.V.A = Edmonton Voters Association
U.R.G.E. = Urban Reform Group Edmonton

Public school trustees

Herb Jamieson - 34991
Shirley Forbes - 31808
Vernon Johnson - 28606
James Falconer - 28259
Catherine Ford - 25461
Ernest Lund - 24732
Mel Binder - 23521
Don Massey - 23471
Jim Patrick - 21968
Betty Flewitt - 21349
Maria Flak - 17914
Jean Haddow - 17217
Gerry Beck - 15700
R W Sherwin - 15416
Anna Pollock - 15376
Al Fahlman - 14366
Bernice Youck - 13030
Ken Kozak - 12299
Ashgar Ali - 10110
William Lee - 9050
Mark Pastic - 6392
Tim Nolt - 6191
William Hegedus - 6135
George Skov - 5524

Separate (Catholic) school trustees

Jean Forest - 14559
Leo Floyd - 14406
Jean McDonald - 11132
W McNeill - 9493
Phil Gibeau - 9425
Raymond Pinkowski - 8499
Laurier Picard - 8348
Robert Carney - 7957
Orest Evenshen - 7898
Nicholas Sheptycki - 6716
Robert Gourdine - 6593
Edward Christie - 6463
Bob McDonald - 5711
Adele - 4946
Larry Messier - 4938
Paul Haljan - 3976
Stanley Blazosek - 3532
Don Davies - 3246
Vincent Hawskwell - 3102

References

City of Edmonton: Edmonton Elections

1974
1974 elections in Canada
1974 in Alberta